Battle of Aldenhoven may refer to:

 Battle of Aldenhoven (1793)
 Battle of Aldenhoven (1794)